National Highway 329, commonly called NH 329 is a national highway in India. It is a spur road of National Highway 29.  NH-329 traverses the state of Assam in India.

This highway in Assam runs between Karbi Anglong and Hojai district. It begin at Manja passing through Diphu and ends at Lumding. It has a total length of 52 km.

Route 
Manja - Diphu - Lumding.

Junctions  
 
  Terminal at Manja.
  at Diphu.
  at Lumding.

See also 
 List of National Highways in India by highway number
 List of National Highways in India by state

References

External links 

 NH 329 on OpenStreetMap

National highways in India
329
Transport in Lumding
Karbi Anglong district